The Wilson Family is an English folk music group from Billingham, County Durham, North East England. They have been singing and performing a cappella folk songs since 1974. They consist of sister Pat and five brothers: Tom, Chris, Steve, Ken and Mike.

The group's roots are founded in the folk clubs of the second British folk revival of the 1960s. They have released a number of recordings, included amongst them their acclaimed full debut album, Horumarye (1983), the first complete album of songs released by any folk artist, dedicated solely to the songwriting of Teesside songwriter, Graeme Miles, and the eponymous The Wilson Family Album released in 1991. They continue to record and are a consistent major attraction at UK Folk Club/Concert & Festival venues.

Projects
In August 2011 the Family sang at the BBC Proms, Royal Albert Hall, collaborating with the Northern Sinfonia, the BBC Singers and Kathryn Tickell.

In January and February 2013, they recorded with Sting songs for his play and album, The Last Ship, which was released on 23 September 2013. The Wilson Family then performed those songs with Sting at a series of 10 benefit concerts, held at the Public Theater, New York, in September and October 2013. The show was broadcast by BBC on 22 December 2013, and featured the group performing songs from The Last Ship stage show and an additional unaccompanied song from their own repertoire, a version of a Rudyard Kipling poem "Big Steamers", put to music by folk musician and friend of the Family, Peter Bellamy.

EFDSS Gold Badge Award
In September 2017, The Wilson Family were awarded the Gold Badge of the English Folk Dance & Song Society (EFDSS). It is the highest honour that the society can bestow. The award was presented to the Group by Alistair Anderson, Chair of EFDSS,  at the opening concert of the Hartlepool Folk Festival, of which The Wilson Family are Patrons, 13 October 2017.

References

English folk musical groups
Musical groups from County Durham
Musical groups established in 1974
1974 establishments in England
People from Billingham